Shor Shoreh, also rendered as Showr Showreh or Shur Shureh, may refer to:

Shor Shoreh, Dorud, Lorestan Province
Shur Shureh, Kuhdasht, Lorestan Province
Shor Shoreh, Markazi